Watch Your Neighbor is a 1918 silent film comedy short directed by Hampton Del Ruth and Victor Heerman. It starred Charles Murray and Mary Thurman. It was produced by Mack Sennett in a distribution deal with Paramount Pictures.

Cast
Charles Murray - M. Balmer, Undertaker
Wayland Trask - Dr. Milton Croaker, Undertaker's Neighbor
Mary Thurman - Mrs. Croaker, The Doctor's Wife
Edgar Kennedy - An Innocent Bystander
Ben Turpin - Banana Peel Victim
Cliff Bowes - Dying Man
Billy Armstrong - Dying Man's Nurse
Albert T. Gillespie - Bowes, Vapor Treatment Seeker (*as Bert Gillespie)

References

External links

poster(HeritageAuctions, or ha)

1918 short films
American silent short films
American black-and-white films
Silent American comedy films
1918 comedy films
1918 films
Films directed by Victor Heerman
Films directed by Hampton Del Ruth
1910s American films